Michael Stepney (born 1980) is a Scottish international indoor bowler.

Bowls career
He won the Scottish National Singles Championship in 2009 and the British Isles Singles Championship the following year. In 2017 he finished runner-up in the Scottish International Open, losing out to David Gourlay. This helped him break into the World's top 16 during 2018.

In 2022, Stepney won the men's singles gold medal at the inaugural World Bowls Indoor Championships, defeating Stewart Anderson in the final.

References

1980 births
Living people
Scottish male bowls players
Indoor Bowls World Champions